Electronic Government Directorate of Pakistan was established October 2002. The directorate was created by the Ministry of Information Technology. In 2014 Directorate was merged with Pakistan Computer Bureau to form National Information Technology Board.

Some of the projects completed by the directorate include:
 Online Processing of Hajj Applications and Status online Tracking for arrangements for Hujjaj
 Automation of Prime Minister Secretariat, Islamabad
 Online Nadra Card Application
 E-Enablement of Senate & National Assembly of Pakistan 
 E-service for submission of documents at Securities and Exchange Commission of Pakistan
 Automation of Estate Office
 Development of Urdu Lexicon, Machine Translation & Text to Speech Software for Urdu language
 Online Access to Statutory Case Laws at District Bar Associations
 Automation of Patent Office, Karachi 
 E-Enablement of Press Clubs
 Salary  Disbursement through ATMs
 IT Skills Training Programme for  Probationary Government Officers
 Process  Mapping for improving efficiency of Ministry of Science & Technology
 Installation  of LAN and implementation of Mail Tracking and Internal E-mail System at 07 Federal  Government Divisions
 IT  Technical Support to Provinces and AJK
 Development of PPHI Website

See also
 Government of Pakistan

References

External links
 A list of e-services provided by Government of Pakistan 

Pakistan
Science and technology in Pakistan
Defunct government departments and agencies of Pakistan
Pakistan federal departments and agencies
Government agencies established in 2002
Government agencies disestablished in 2014